The 2001 Harvard Crimson football team was an American football team that represented Harvard University during the 2001 NCAA Division I-AA football season. Harvard was undefeated and won the Ivy League championship.

In their eighth year under head coach Timothy Murphy, the Crimson compiled a 9–0 record and outscored opponents 293 to 184. Ryan FitzGerald was the team captain.

Harvard's undefeated (7–0) conference record placed first in the Ivy League standings. The Crimson outscored Ivy opponents 220 to 150.

Like most of the Ivy League, Harvard played nine games instead of the usual 10, after the school made the decision to cancel its September 15 season opener against Holy Cross, following the September 11 attacks. It was the first year in more than two decades without a Crimson-Crusader football game, and the only year without the intrastate matchup between 1981 and 2015.

The Crimson began the year unranked, and did not enter the national top 25 until they had recorded its seventh win without a loss. Harvard entered the season's penultimate week at No. 24 and rose to No. 19 after defeating a ranked Penn Quakers team.

Harvard played its home games at Harvard Stadium in the Allston neighborhood of Boston, Massachusetts.

Schedule

References

Harvard
Harvard Crimson football seasons
Ivy League football champion seasons
College football undefeated seasons
Harvard Crimson football
Harvard Crimson football